Sara Errani and Roberta Vinci were the defending champions, but lost in the semifinals to Květa Peschke and Katarina Srebotnik.
Hsieh Su-wei and Peng Shuai won the title, defeating Peschke and Srebotnik in the final, 6–4, 6–0.  By winning her second round match, Peng replaced Errani and Vinci as the world No. 1 in doubles.

Seeds

Draw

Finals

Top half

Bottom half

References
 Main Draw

2014 WTA Tour
2014 Qatar Total Open – Doubles
2014 in Qatari sport